Juan Abalos de Mendoza known as "el viejo" (1560 – 1605) was a Paraguayan explorer and colonizer in South America.

Biography 
Born in Asunción, his parents were Gonzalo Casco and María de Mendoza Irala daughter of Gonzalo de Mendoza, and granddaughter Domingo Martínez de Irala. Mendoza married first with Bernardina Guerra de Sepúlveda, and after being widowed to Juana Cejas, whom he had three sons. Abalos de Mendoza, came from Asunción to Santiago del Estero, and then permanently established in Buenos Aires, and was appointed Regidor in 1598.

Juan Abalos de Mendoza was a personal friend of the founder of Buenos Aires Juan de Garay.

References 

1560 births
1605 deaths
16th-century explorers
Spanish military personnel